Demetros was a military commander under several Emperors, from Yohannes I to Tewoflos. He was regarded as a founder of a local dynasty in his native Merhabete, from where he initiated wars of reconquest of Shewan territories against the Oromos. Under Iyasu I he was elevated to the governship (Sahafe Lam) of Shewa.

Biography

Background 
Of Amhara lineage, Demetros was a native from the Shewan district of Merhabete. While most of Shewa was conquered by the Oromo invasions, Christian communities survived in his homeland of Merhabete. There were unbroken links with the empire, and the Christian regeneration took place well before the better known case of the Menz dynasty of his Shewan Amhara contemporary, Negasi Krestos.

Lasta campaign 
In December 1679, after months of tensions between the crown and the region of Lasta, Emperor Yohannes I launched an punitive expedition into Lasta. On the 7th day of the campaign, the imperial forces were hindered by unfavorable weather conditions. Detached from the imperial army by the order of his majesty, dejazmach Demetros destroyed a fortress in Dabot, seizing glory that day. 

On the 8th day, Demetros further distinguished himself by taking an mountain settlement called Maskot, which previous emperors and commanders failed to conquer.

Conflict against the Oromos - 1684 
In 1684, the Edju Oromos invaded Amhara, dejazmach Demetros fought alongside Emperor Iyasu I to expel them. The enemy were caught in a narrow defile, from each end of which they were attacked and slain in large numbers.

1690's 
Throughout the 1690s Demetros was a close confidant of Iyasu I, helping plan attacks on the Oromos and participating in Iyasu's campaigns. By 1693 he held the title of Sahafe Lam of Shewa. By the end of the decade, however, he had lost favour at Iyasu's court. In March 1699, at the conclusion of yet another campaign against the Oromo, Iyasu stripped Demetros of his appointment as Sahafe Lam of Shewa, and reduced his territorial control to his homeland, the district of Merhabete.

Notes

References

17th-century Ethiopian people
18th-century Ethiopian people 
History of Ethiopia